Frank Sharp (born 28 May 1947) is a Scottish former footballer who scored 13 goals in 231 league games in a ten-year career in the Football League and Scottish Football League. A winger, he played for Heart of Midlothian, Carlisle United, Cardiff City, Barnsley, Grimsby Town, Port Vale, and Northwich Victoria.

Career
Sharp began his career at junior side Tynecastle Athletic before turning professional with Tommy Walker's Heart of Midlothian. Hearts finished seventh and 11th in the First Division in 1965–66 and 1966–67. He appeared in just six league games at Tynecastle, scoring one goal. In 1967, Sharp joined Carlisle United for a fee of £500, but struggled to hold down a regular first team place at Brunton Park. The "Cumbrians" finished mid-table in the Second Division in 1967–68 and 1968–69 under the stewardship of first Tim Ward and then Bob Stokoe. He then moved on to Jimmy Scoular's Second Division side Cardiff City. Plagued by injury, Sharp spent just over one season at Ninian Park, his only goal coming in a 1–1 draw with Hull City in March 1970, before he joined Barnsley along with Leslie Lea. Johnny Steele's "Tykes" finished 12th in the Third Division in 1970–71, before suffering relegation in 1971–72 under the stewardship of rookie manager John McSeveney. Johnny Steele then returned to Barnsley, and led the club to a 14th-place finish in the Fourth Division in 1972–73. Sharp scored seven goals in 125 league appearances at Oakwell. He then scored two goals in 29 Third Division games at Ron Ashman's Grimsby Town in the 1973–74 season. He left Blundell Park and joined Third Division side Port Vale in May 1974. He opened the 1974–75 season with a goal in each of his first two games at Vale Park, but lost his first team place in November and went to finish the season with 27 league and cup appearances. He was given a free transfer in May 1975 by "Valiants" manager Roy Sproson, and moved on to Northern Premier League side Northwich Victoria.

Career statistics
Source:

References

Footballers from Edinburgh
Scottish footballers
Association football wingers
Heart of Midlothian F.C. players
Carlisle United F.C. players
Cardiff City F.C. players
Barnsley F.C. players
Grimsby Town F.C. players
Port Vale F.C. players
Northwich Victoria F.C. players
Scottish Football League players
English Football League players
Northern Premier League players
1947 births
Living people